What Do You Say, Dear? is a 1958 children's picture book written by Sesyle Joslin and illustrated by Maurice Sendak. The book, published by W. R. Scott, is a humorous take on a book about manners. The book was a recipient of a 1959 Caldecott Honor for its illustrations.

References

1958 children's books
American picture books
Caldecott Honor-winning works